Nitrogen oxide may refer to a binary compound of oxygen and nitrogen, or a mixture of such compounds:

Charge-neutral

Nitric oxide (NO), nitrogen(II) oxide, or nitrogen monoxide
Nitrogen dioxide, nitrogen(IV) oxide
Nitrogen trioxide, or nitrate radical
Nitrous oxide, nitrogen(0,II) oxide
Dinitrogen dioxide, nitrogen(II) oxide dimer
Dinitrogen trioxide, nitrogen(II,IV) oxide
Dinitrogen tetroxide, nitrogen(IV) oxide dimer
Dinitrogen pentoxide, nitrogen(V) oxide, or nitronium nitrate 
Nitrosyl azide, nitrogen(−I,0,I,II) oxide
Nitryl azide
Oxatetrazole
Trinitramide ( or ), nitrogen(0,IV) oxide

Anions
Nitroxide
Nitrite ( or )
Nitrate
Peroxynitrite ( or )
Peroxynitrate ( or )
Orthonitrate (analogous to phosphate )
Hyponitrite ( or )
Trioxodinitrate or hyponitrate ( or ) 
Nitroxylate ( or )
Dinitramide ( or )

Cations
Nitrosonium ( or )
Nitronium ( or )

Atmospheric sciences
In atmospheric chemistry:
 (or NOz) =  −

Aerospace
Mixed Oxides of Nitrogen ("MON"): solutions of nitric oxide in dinitrogen tetroxide/nitrogen dioxide.

Stability

See also
Nitrate
Nitrogen oxide sensor
Sulfur nitrides, which are valence isoelectronic with nitrogen oxides

References

Industrial gases